Vámosszabadi is a village in Győr-Moson-Sopron County, Hungary.

External links
Official website

Populated places in Győr-Moson-Sopron County